Wola is a small town and commune in the Cercle of Bougouni in the Sikasso Region of south-western Mali. In 1998 the commune had a population of 10,158.

References

Communes of Sikasso Region